Mauritius Telecom Ltd (Mauritius Telecom or MT) is the leading provider of an extensive range of ICT services and solutions for both residential customers and businesses in Mauritius, including fixed, mobile, internet, TV, mobile money and ICT services.

The Company was incorporated in 1988 as Mauritius Telecommunication Services and in 1992, after merging with Overseas Telecommunications Services (previously Cable & Wireless), it was renamed Mauritius Telecom. In 2000, Mauritius Telecom entered into a strategic partnership with France Telecom (now Orange S.A.), which acquired 40% of its shares in the context of the impending liberalisation of the country’s telecommunications sector.

Mauritius Telecom has played a pivotal role in the socio-economic development of Mauritius, by setting up a telecommunications infrastructure connecting Mauritius to the world through sustained investment in international bandwidth and capacity, and through the launch of innovative services to meet its customers’ evolving needs. Through its numerous initiatives, Mauritius Telecom has paved the way for the growth of the ICT industry, which has become a major pillar of the Mauritian economy. By the end of 2017, the Company had completed island-wide fibre deployment, thereby enabling Mauritian citizens and businesses to benefit from ultra-high-speed broadband internet.

Innovation is embedded in the Company’s DNA. In recent years, several game-changing services and products have been introduced: my.t money, a service that has revolutionised the payments industry, was launched in 2019, followed by the first truly unlimited prepay and postpay data packages, the payment of all utility bills (CEB, CWA and MT bills) via a single digital platform, the my.t billpay app.

In 2021, MT once again led Mauritius’ digital evolution, bringing in a new era of connectivity on mobile and fibre through the launch of the first my.t 5G Experience Zones and the first 1Gbps fibre internet offer in Mauritius.

Shareholders

Subsidiaries
Mauritius Telecom owns the following companies:
 Cellplus Mobile Communications Ltd
 Telecom Plus Ltd
 Teleforce Ltd
 Call Services Ltd
 MT Properties Ltd
 Mauritius Telecom Foundation
 MT International Ventures Ltd
 MT Services Ltd

The my.t brand
Mauritius Telecom portfolio of fixed, mobile, broadband and IPTV services is  consolidated under one single umbrella brand: my.t, delivering ultra-fast broadband speeds, top-notch mobile and fixed services, a broad suite of premium TV content and fintech solutions. Overall, the my.t brand is focused on innovation, delighting customers and building a digital future for everyone.

Websites

References

Telecommunications companies of Mauritius
Companies based in Port Louis